Cyrus L. Philipp was Chairman of the Republican Party of Wisconsin from 1934 to 1938. Additionally, he was a member of the Republican National Committee from 1944 to 1952 and was active in the Milwaukee County, Wisconsin Republican Party. Philipp was also a delegate to the 1952 Republican National Convention. His father, Emanuel, was Governor of Wisconsin.

References

Politicians from Milwaukee
Republican Party of Wisconsin chairs
Year of death missing
Year of birth missing
Wisconsin Republicans